Kenneth Strickfaden (May 23, 1896 – February 29, 1984) was an electrician, film set designer, and electrical  special effects creator.  Beginning with his effects on Frankenstein (1931) he became Hollywood's preeminent electrical special effects expert.   He created the science fiction apparatus in more than 100 motion picture films and television programs, from the Frankenstein films to The Wizard of Oz and The Mask of Fu Manchu to television's The Munsters, and his final work, Young Frankenstein (1974).

External links 
 
 Missing Link Classic Horror Listing
 Book: Kenneth Strickfaden – Dr. Frankenstein's Electrician
 
 Memorabilia Heritage Auction Galleries
 Modern Mechanix scan of a Popular Mechanics article from 1949

Special effects people
1896 births
1984 deaths